The Liverpool, Ormskirk & Preston Railway in north-west England was formed in 1846. It was purchased by the East Lancashire Railway the following year and opened to traffic on 2 April 1849.

The railway ran from a junction with the Liverpool and Bury Railway near Walton northwards via  to a west-facing junction with the Blackburn & Preston Railway just east of Lostock Hall. Documents from 1847 signed by Joseph Locke, Sturges Meek and Mackenzie, Brassey & Stephenson show elevations, plans and sections for bridges on line.

From May 1859, it became part of the Lancashire and Yorkshire Railway system, following the ELR's absorption by that company.  Under L&YR ownership, it became the company's main line from Liverpool to Preston & East Lancashire and carried through express trains to Blackpool and Scotland via ,  and the Settle-Carlisle Line as well as significant quantities of freight to the docks in Liverpool.  From 1891, it was linked directly to the West Coast Main Line by a new connection near  built as part of the work to upgrade that part of the route to four tracks.  The southern end of the route was subsequently electrified by the L&YR in stages between 1906 (as far as Aintree) and 1913 (through to Ormskirk).

Today the line still operates, though through services between Liverpool and Preston/East Lancashire were withdrawn in 1969/70.  The section between Liverpool and Ormskirk forms part of Merseyrail's Northern Line and the section between Ormskirk and Preston forming Northern's Ormskirk Branch Line. The two sections meet at Ormskirk station on the same alignment but are now separated by buffers in a rare type of cross platform interchange.

Connections to other railways

North Mersey Branch and the North Liverpool Extension Line at 
East Lancashire Line at

External links
 https://web.archive.org/web/20050410094226/http://www.railwayancestors.fsnet.co.uk/research.html
 Railscot - Photos of the Liverpool, Ormskirk & Preston Railway

Historic transport in Merseyside
Lancashire and Yorkshire Railway
Rail transport in Lancashire
Liverpool Ormskirk and Preston
Railway companies established in 1846
Railway companies disestablished in 1847
1846 establishments in England
British companies disestablished in 1847
British companies established in 1846